Jarmwar is a village in Rudraprayag district, Uttarakhand, northern India. It is at a distance of about 30-35 kilometres from the main market of Rudraprayag and lies on the Rudraprayag-Chopra-Pokhari-Udamanda road.

The nearby villages include Jaggi Kandai, Eshala, Banthapla, Bijrakot, Mohan Nagar, Thapalganv, Dhung, Benji kandai, Agar, Kokhandi and Quidi. The population of the village is around 100-200,but most of people have migrated to other major cities due to unemployment and poorer living conditions.

Facilities
Educational facilities are provided elsewhere, at places such as Bainji Kandai and Kandai. The nearest locations for higher education are at Agastyamuni, Rudraprayag, Gopeshwar and Karanprayag, and at the Hemwati Nandan Bahuguna Garhwal University.

The nearest government hospital is at Kandai.
Jagtoli is a Green Pasture area located on top of village with a small marketplace, a Temple and a Government Inter College.The GIC Kandai Dashjula is the only educational institute in this area. Students have to migrate to the other places for higher education. Jagtoli is now being exploited as a place for residential area by many villagers as it is connected to a road. There is a Kartik Swami mandir situated in the village. The local Pandav Nritya is also performed at here.

Villages in Rudraprayag district